Bow Wave is an outdoor fountain and sculpture by Malcolm Leland, installed at San Diego's Civic Center Plaza, in the U.S. state of California, in 1972.

See also

 1972 in art

References

1972 establishments in California
1972 sculptures
Fountains in California
Outdoor sculptures in San Diego